Hana Krampolová (12 June 1961 – 3 August 2020) was a Czech actress. She was the wife of the actor Jiří Krampol.

Krampolová died in Prague on 3 August 2020, aged 59.

References

20th-century Czech actresses
1961 births
2020 deaths
Actresses from Prague
Place of death missing